MacBriare Samuel Lanyon DeMarco (born Vernor Winfield MacBriare Smith IV; April 30, 1990) is a Canadian singer-songwriter, multi-instrumentalist and producer. DeMarco has released five full-length studio albums, his debut, 2 (2012), Salad Days (2014), This Old Dog (2017), Here Comes the Cowboy (2019), and Five Easy Hot Dogs (2023). He additionally released the mini-album Another One in 2015. His style of music has been described as "blue wave" and "slacker rock", or, by DeMarco himself, "jizz jazz".

Life and career

1990–2008: Early life and education
DeMarco was born in Duncan, British Columbia on Vancouver Island, and raised in Edmonton, Alberta. His great-grandfather is Vernor Smith, Alberta's former Minister of Railways and Telephones, for whom DeMarco was named, and his grandfather (also named Vernor Winfield McBriare Smith) was a judge of the Court of King's Bench of Alberta. His mother, Agnes DeMarco, later changed his name to McBriare Samuel Lanyon DeMarco after his father left when Mac was 4 and refused to pay child support. DeMarco is also of Italian descent.

Mac DeMarco attended McKernan School for junior high. Around this time he started playing guitar, with lessons from his grandmother. During high school he was in several bands, including indie rock band the Meat Cleavers, alternative R&B group the Sound of Love and post-punk band Outdoor Miners (along with current keyboardist, Alec Meen), which was named after "Outdoor Miner", a song by English rock band Wire. He started smoking cigarettes as a teenager, which has now become a big part of his image. In January 2023 DeMarco said he no longer smokes cigarettes.

After graduating from Strathcona High School in Edmonton in 2008, DeMarco became a backing musician. After that, he moved to Vancouver.

2009–2012: Early projects and Rock and Roll Night Club
Living in the Killarney neighbourhood, he released a self-produced album, Heat Wave, as a part of the indie rock project Makeout Videotape in 2009. The album sold out its 500-unit run. DeMarco worked on "psychedelic" video projects during this time. He was joined by Alex Calder and Jen Clement, signed to Unfamiliar Records, and toured with Vancouver band Japandroids in 2009. In 2011, DeMarco moved from Vancouver to Montreal to begin recording as a solo artist. Failing to find work as a musician, he participated in medical experiments for money and worked on a road paving crew. On January 9, 2012, record label Captured Tracks announced the signing of DeMarco. In early 2012, he released an LP titled Rock and Roll Night Club. The four-track-recorded album features skits and slowed-down vocals.

2012–2015: 2, Salad Days and Another One

Rock and Roll Night Club impressed his new label enough that they agreed to release a full-length follow-up album. This release, entitled 2, was received well by critics, garnering a "Best New Music" designation from Pitchfork. One of his songs, "Moving Like Mike", was licensed by U.S. retail outlet Target for a commercial.

On January 21, 2014, DeMarco announced the release of his upcoming second album, Salad Days, along with debuting the lead single "Passing Out Pieces". The record was released on April 1, 2014, and again received the "Best New Music" designation from Pitchfork. It was a shortlisted nominee for the 2014 Polaris Music Prize.

DeMarco made his first talk show appearance (and second TV appearance after The Eric Andre Show) when he performed the song "Let Her Go" on Conan on March 30, 2015. On April 22, 2015, DeMarco announced the release of an upcoming album titled Another One, which was released on August 7, 2015, in addition to a video depicting the making of Another One. DeMarco describes the album to be a collection of love songs, "It's just kind of like every angle of how somebody might feel if they're having strange feelings in their chest." On May 11, 2015, Captured Tracks released the first single of Another One, titled "The Way You'd Love Her". Another One received a generally favourable response from music critics, scoring 75/100 on Metacritic. Still in Rock has ranked this LP as the third best of 2015.

On July 8, 2015, DeMarco released a 9-track instrumental album titled Some Other Ones and called it a "BBQ soundtrack". Later that evening, he hosted a listening party in New York City (where DeMarco was based) for fans to hear Another One, where they could get free hot dogs if they donated to a food bank.

2017–2018: This Old Dog
On January 31, 2017, DeMarco announced his third studio album, titled This Old Dog. He also released two singles from the album on the same day. This Old Dog was released on May 5, 2017.

On October 10, 2017, DeMarco appeared on Charlie Rose, in which the two discussed the new album, as well as DeMarco's relationship with his father. Acting as bookends to the interview, DeMarco performed acoustic versions of This Old Dog, as well as Still Together.

On April 8, 2018, DeMarco appeared on FishCenter Live and had an interview with Max Simonet. He partnered with the non-profit organization Plus1 for his tours that year, and one dollar for every ticket purchase went to the Girls Rock Camp Alliance to: "[empower] girls, trans and gender-diverse young people through music education and mentorship."

2019–2020: Here Comes the Cowboy
On March 5, 2019, DeMarco announced his fourth studio album Here Comes the Cowboy and shared the first single off the album, "Nobody". The album was released on May 10, 2019, on Mac's Record Label. A controversy emerged once it was pointed out online that DeMarco's album shared a similar title to the 2018 album Be the Cowboy by Mitski and that her album had also included a single called "Nobody". According to Pitchfork, DeMarco had "never listened to Mitski's album and learned about her album and song title only after determining his own album title and single". Mitski responded to the controversy on Twitter, stating, "I'm 100% sure mac & I just went fishing in the same part of the collective unconscious!". The album received mixed reviews from critics and audiences upon release. It marked his first top ten appearance in the US Billboard 200 at number 10.

On September 7, 2020, DeMarco was featured on a collaboration with English artist Yellow Days, entitled "The Curse". On October 28, 2020, DeMarco was again featured on French musician Myd's single "Moving Men". An animated version of DeMarco also appeared in the music video for the single. Released October 28, 2020, DeMarco also appeared in the music video for the song "Whatever You Want" by Crowded House. DeMarco contributed a cover of the Metallica song "Enter Sandman" to the charity tribute album The Metallica Blacklist, released in September 2021.

2021–present: Line-up changes, Five Easy Hot Dogs and "Heart to Heart" success
In October 2021, DeMarco returned to live performances following a hiatus due to the COVID-19 pandemic. His return to the stage was marked by changes to his live band, with the departure of longtime members Joe McMurray, Andrew White and Jon Lent, and the addition of Darryl Johns (bass) and JD Beck (drums). Andy White confirmed his departure shortly afterwards stating: "Mac’s an old friend, life is long, and no one knows the future. I'm incredibly stoked to see his new line-up soon as I can. I loved his band before I was in it. I loved playing in it, and I will always look forward to what our bud is putting together in the future."

DeMarco released an instrumental album, Five Easy Hot Dogs, on January 20, 2023. The fourteen-track album was recorded in different locations during a road trip from Los Angeles to Utah.

During the week of Five Easy Hot Dogs release, the track "Heart to Heart" from DeMarco's previous album, Here Comes the Cowboy, became a viral hit on TikTok. As a result, the song became DeMarco's first to chart on the Billboard Hot 100, eventually peaking at #83. The song also  reached the top 10 and top 5 of Billboard's Hot Rock Songs and Hot Alternative Songs charts, respectively. 

Artistry
DeMarco's style employs the use of flat drums (little or no reverberation or dynamic range compression), chorus and vibrato effects on the guitar and a generally lazy atmosphere a la soft rock records, muted and low frequency bass guitars. He has mentioned Shuggie Otis, Black Sabbath, Christopher Cross, Siouxsie and the Banshees, Jonathan Richman, Genesis, Sting and Weezer as favourite artists. He has also cited Japanese musician Haruomi Hosono as his favourite artist. DeMarco's music has been generally termed as Indie rock, psychedelic rock, jangle pop, and lo-fi. His guitar-based compositions have moved from glam-inspired works to what reviewers describe as "off-kilter pop" or "folk rock". DeMarco has self identified his style as "jizz jazz", going as far as naming his apartment studio Jizz Jazz Studios, as mentioned in a documentary starring himself, Pepperoni Playboy. DeMarco has pointed to artists such as John Maus, Ariel Pink, Brian Eno, Daniel Lopatin, Isao Tomita and R. Stevie Moore as influences on his reel-to-reel production style.

 Equipment 

DeMarco uses vintage equipment and gear for his music. He mainly played on a $30 Teisco electric guitar that was already in poor condition, and stopped playing it live since it would often break apart. He additionally uses Fender guitars, such as a 1970s Stratocaster, a 1960s Mustang, a 1990s Squier Stratocaster and an HSS Shawbucker Stratocaster, of which his live band were given 11 as a result of an endorsement deal with Fender. His bass guitar mainly used for recording is a Teisco/Stagg bass.

He uses vintage Japanese synthesizers, including a Yamaha DX7 and a Korg Microsampler. Additional models include a Rhodes piano, a Moog Realistic MG-1, a Prophet 5, a Roland Juno 60, JX-3P, and a Yamaha DX100. Amplifiers used include a 1970s Fender Twin Reverb, a Roland JC-120, and both a small Fender Vibro-Champ and a large Roland KC-550; DeMarco uses them during stage performances by hooking his keyboards with the vibro-champ amplifier which was linked to the KC-550. Effect pedals used are a MXR Micro-Amp, a Boss CE-2 Chorus, a Boss VB-2 Vibrato, TU-3 tuner, an Electro-Harmonix Holy Grail Reverb, an EHX Polyphonic Octave Generator and a JHS Pedals Colour Box for overdrive tones.

DeMarco records his music on reel-to-reel tape recorders, such as a Fostex A-8, a Tascam 388, an Alesis Micro Limiter and a Roland Space Echo RE-201. However, he recorded his album This Old Dog on a MacBook with an Apogee Quartet interface. He uses a Neumann U87 condenser mic, a Royer R-121 ribbon mic, and a four channel Neve Portico preamp strip with his Ableton setup. DeMarco also uses a Roland CR-78 drum machine to record demos.

Personal life
He regularly hosts jam sessions with musicians and friends such as Thundercat and the late Mac Miller.
In February of 2023 Mac’s cat “Pickles” passed away from unspecified causes.

 Mac's Record Label 
In 2018, DeMarco launched his own record label aptly titled 'Mac's Record Label'. In 2021, the first artist to be signed was Tex Crick with his album Live In... New York City, followed by Vicky Farewell with her album Sweet Company in 2022.

Awards and nominations
{| class="wikitable sortable plainrowheaders" 
|-
! scope="col" | Award
! scope="col" | Year
! scope="col" | Category
! scope="col" | Nominee(s)
! scope="col" | Result
! scope="col" class="unsortable"| 
|-
! scope="row" rowspan=3|Polaris Music Prize
| 2013
| Album of the Year (Longlist)
| 2
| 
|
|-
| 2014
| Album of the Year (Shortlist)
| Salad Days
| 
|
|-
| 2017
| Album of the Year (Longlist)
| This Old Dog
| 
|
|-
! scope="row" rowspan=3|Rober Awards Music Prize
| 2012
| Breakthrough Artist
| rowspan=3|Himself
| 
|
|-
| rowspan=2|2014
| Best Male Artist
| 
|rowspan=2|
|-
| Best Songwriter
| 

Backing band membersCurrent membersAlec Meen – keyboards, backing vocals, percussion (2017–present), guitar (2021–present)
Daryl Johns — bass guitar, backing vocals (2021–present)
JD Beck — drums (2021–present)Former membersPeter Sagar (Homeshake) – guitar, keyboards, backing vocals (2012–2014)
Pierce McGarry – bass guitar, backing vocals (2012–2016)
Rory McCarthy – bass guitar (2016)
Joe McMurray – drums, occasional backing vocals (2012–2021)
Andrew Charles White – guitar, keyboards, percussion, backing vocals (2014–2021)
Jon Lent – bass guitar (2016–2021), keyboards, percussion (2015–2016)

Timeline

DiscographyStudio albums 2 (2012)
 Salad Days (2014)
 This Old Dog (2017)
 Here Comes the Cowboy (2019)
 Five Easy Hot Dogs (2023)Mini-LP albums Rock and Roll Night Club (2012)
 Another One (2015)Demos Another (Demo) One (2016)
 Old Dog Demos (2018)
 Here Comes the Cowboy Demos (2020)
 Other Here Comes the Cowboy Demos (2020)

With Makeout Videotape
Adapted from the Bandcamp music store.Studio albums Ying Yang (2010)Extended plays (EPs)Compilations'''
 Eyeballing'' (2010)

References

External links

 Record company profile
 

1990 births
Canadian indie rock musicians
Canadian rock guitarists
Canadian male guitarists
Canadian rock singers
Canadian male singer-songwriters
Canadian singer-songwriters
Canadian people of Italian descent
Captured Tracks artists
Living people
Musicians from British Columbia
Musicians from Edmonton
People from Duncan, British Columbia
21st-century Canadian guitarists
21st-century Canadian male singers
Ableton Live users